Guillermo Durán (born 6 June 1988) is an Argentine tennis player playing on the ATP Challenger Tour. On 2 April 2012, he reached his highest ATP singles ranking of 385. His highest ATP doubles ranking of 48 was achieved on 23 May 2016.

ATP career finals

Doubles: 5 (4 titles, 1 runner-up)

Challenger and Futures finals

Singles: 10 (1–9)

Doubles: 76 (47–29)

Notes

External links
 
 

1988 births
Living people
Argentine male tennis players
Tennis players at the 2016 Summer Olympics
Olympic tennis players of Argentina
Sportspeople from Tucumán Province
21st-century Argentine people